St. Thomas Aquinas University (today the Autonomous University of Santo Domingo, UASD), is arguably the first institution of higher education in the Americas. It was founded by papal bull in 1538 in Santo Domingo, in the Caribbean island of Hispaniola, present-day Dominican Republic, although it didn't have the official certification by the king of Spain until 1558. The headquarters of the university was the Church and Convent of los Dominicos. It was closed in 1801 and in 1823, being reopened as a new iteration in 1914.

History

Founded during the reign of Charles I of Spain, it was originally a seminary operated by Catholic monks of the Dominican Order. Later, the institution received a university charter by Pope Paul III's papal bull In Apostulatus Culmine, dated October 28, 1538. However, it did not obtain the official Privilege by Charles V to be officially recognized as a university until 1558. Thus, there is a debate on whether it is officially the first university in the Americas.  Many of the first universities argue that they were the first because UASD was not yet recognized. The counter argument being that whether the university was recognized by a foreign body or not is irrelevant,  as the university granted higher education degrees since it was founded in 1538.

Prior to its conversion into a full university, the institution had been a Studium Generate (seminary), founded in 1518 and operated by the Dominican Order.

In its structure and purpose the new university was modeled after the University of Alcalá in the city of Henares, Spain. In this capacity it became a standard-bearer for the medieval ideology of the Spanish Conquest, and gained its royal charter in 1558. In this royal decree, the university was given the name University of Saint Thomas Aquinas (Universidad Santo Tomás de Aquino).

The university was closed in 1801 under the French, but reopened in 1815 as a secular institution. It closed again in 1823, during the Haitian occupation of Santo Domingo, when all students were ordered into military services.

In 1866, the government decreed the creation of the Professional Institute (Instituto Profesional), which operated as substitution of the defunct university. And on November 16, 1914, President Ramón Báez, decreed its transformation into the University of St. Thomas (Universidad de Santo Domingo), successor of the first one.

See also 
 Church and Convent of los Dominicos
 List of universities in the Dominican Republic
List of colonial universities in Latin America

References

External links
 UASD Official website

Educational institutions established in the 1530s
1538 establishments in the Spanish Empire
Universities in the Dominican Republic
Education in Santo Domingo
Educational institutions disestablished in 1823
1823 disestablishments in the Spanish West Indies